The Albany FireWolves are a lacrosse team based in Albany, New York playing in the National Lacrosse League (NLL). The 2022 season was the franchise's 6th season in the league, 1st as the Albany FireWolves. The New England Black Wolves moved to Albany to become the Albany FireWolves prior to this season.

Regular season

Current standings

Game log

Playoffs

Roster

Entry Draft
The 2021 NLL Entry Draft took place on August 28, 2021. The FireWolves made the following selections:

References

Albany FireWolves

Albany FireWolves seasons